J. Bradley Morris (September 10, 1937 – February 25, 2022) was an American politician.

Bradley lived in Medford, Oregon, and graduated from University of Oregon. He served in the United States Army reserves with the rank of captain. Morris served in the Oregon House of Representatives from 1973 to 1977.

References

1937 births
2022 deaths
People from Medford, Oregon
Military personnel from Oregon
University of Oregon alumni
Members of the Oregon House of Representatives